Marilyn More is a Canadian retired educator and politician from Nova Scotia.

A resident of Dartmouth, More worked as a teacher.

Political career
More was first elected to political office in 1978, when she became the first woman to be elected to a school board in Nova Scotia, having been elected to the Dartmouth School Board for three consecutive terms.  More has been active with the Nova Scotia New Democratic Party and is a past-President of the party.

In 2003 More successfully ran for the Nova Scotia New Democratic Party nomination in the riding of Dartmouth South-Portland Valley.  More was elected in the 2003 provincial election and was re-elected in the 2006 and 2009 provincial elections.

On June 19, 2009 More was appointed to the Executive Council of Nova Scotia where she served as Minister of Education and Early Childhood Development, as well as Minister of Labour and Workforce Development, and Minister of Volunteerism. On January 11, 2011, Premier Darrell Dexter shuffled his cabinet, naming More as Minister of Labour and Advanced Education as well as the minister of both Immigration and Status of Women. On March 15, 2013, More was shuffled to Minister responsible for the Public Service Commission, Communications Nova Scotia and the Status of Women.

More did not run for re-election in the 2013 provincial election.

References

Nova Scotia New Democratic Party MLAs
Women MLAs in Nova Scotia
Living people
Members of the Executive Council of Nova Scotia
People from Dartmouth, Nova Scotia
21st-century Canadian politicians
21st-century Canadian women politicians
Women government ministers of Canada
Year of birth missing (living people)